Ice sheet dynamics describe the motion within large bodies of ice, such those currently on Greenland and Antarctica. Ice motion is dominated by the movement of glaciers, whose gravity-driven activity is controlled by two main variable factors: the temperature and the strength of their bases. A number of processes alter these two factors, resulting in cyclic surges of activity interspersed with longer periods of inactivity, on both hourly and centennial time scales. Ice-sheet dynamics are of interest in modelling future sea level rise.

General

Boundary conditions
The interface between an ice stream and the ocean is a significant control of the rate of flow.  

Ice shelves are thick layers of ice floating on the sea – can stabilise the glaciers that feed them.  These tend to have accumulation on their tops, may experience melting on their bases, and calve icebergs at their periphery.  The catastrophic collapse of the Larsen B ice shelf in the space of three weeks during February 2002 yielded some unexpected observations.  The glaciers that had fed the ice sheet (Crane, Jorum, Green, Hektoria – see image) increased substantially in velocity.  This cannot have been due to seasonal variability, as glaciers flowing into the remnants of the ice shelf (Flask, Leppard) did not accelerate.

Ice shelves exert a dominant control in Antarctica, but are less important in Greenland, where the ice sheet meets the sea in fjords. Here, melting is the dominant ice removal process, resulting in predominant mass loss occurring towards the edges of the ice sheet, where icebergs are calved in the fjords and surface meltwater runs into the ocean.

Tidal effects are also important; the influence of a 1 m tidal oscillation can be felt as much as 100 km from the sea. On an hour-to-hour basis, surges of ice motion can be modulated by tidal activity.  During larger spring tides, an ice stream will remain almost stationary for hours at a time, before a surge of around a foot in under an hour, just after the peak high tide; a stationary period then takes hold until another surge towards the middle or end of the falling tide. At neap tides, this interaction is less pronounced, without tides surges would occur more randomly, approximately every 12 hours.

Ice shelves are also sensitive to basal melting.  In Antarctica, this is driven by heat fed to the shelf by the circumpolar deep water current, which is 3 °C above the ice's melting point.

As well as heat, the sea can also exchange salt with the oceans. The effect of latent heat, resulting from melting of ice or freezing of sea water, also has a role to play.  The effects of these, and variability in snowfall and base sea level combined, account for around 80 mm annual variability in ice shelf thickness.

Long-term changes
Over long time scales, ice sheet mass balance is governed by the amount of sunlight reaching the earth. This variation in sunlight reaching the earth, or insolation, over geologic time is in turn determined by the angle of the earth to the sun and shape of the Earth's orbit, as it is pulled on by neighboring planets; these variations occur in predictable patterns called Milankovitch cycles. Milankovitch cycles dominate climate on the glacial–interglacial timescale, but there exist variations in ice sheet extent that are not linked directly with insolation.

For instance, during at least the last 100,000 years, portions of the ice sheet covering much of North America, the Laurentide Ice Sheet broke apart sending large flotillas of icebergs into the North Atlantic. When these icebergs melted they dropped the boulders and other continental rocks they carried, leaving layers known as ice rafted debris. These so-called Heinrich events, named after their discoverer Hartmut Heinrich, appear to have a 7,000–10,000-year periodicity, and occur during cold periods within the last interglacial.

Internal ice sheet "binge-purge" cycles may be responsible for the observed effects, where the ice builds to unstable levels, then a portion of the ice sheet collapses. External factors might also play a role in forcing ice sheets. Dansgaard–Oeschger events are abrupt warmings of the northern hemisphere occurring over the space of perhaps 40 years. While these D–O events occur directly after each Heinrich event, they also occur more frequently – around every 1500 years; from this evidence, paleoclimatologists surmise that the same forcings may drive both Heinrich and D–O events.

Hemispheric asynchrony in ice sheet behavior has been observed by linking short-term spikes of methane in Greenland ice cores and Antarctic ice cores. During Dansgaard–Oeschger events, the northern hemisphere warmed considerably, dramatically increasing the release of methane from wetlands, that were otherwise tundra during glacial times. This methane quickly distributes evenly across the globe, becoming incorporated in Antarctic and Greenland ice. With this tie, paleoclimatologists have been able to say that the ice sheets on Greenland only began to warm after the Antarctic ice sheet had been warming for several thousand years. Why this pattern occurs is still open for debate.

Glaciers

Flow dynamics

The main cause of flow within glaciers can be attributed to an increase in the surface slope, brought upon by an imbalance between the amounts of accumulation vs. ablation. This imbalance increases the shear stress on a glacier until it begins to flow. The flow velocity and deformation will increase as the equilibrium line between these two processes is approached, but are also affected by the slope of the ice, the ice thickness and temperature.

When the amount of strain (deformation) is proportional to the stress being applied, ice will act as an elastic solid. Ice will not flow until it has reached a thickness of 30 meters (98 ft), but after 50 meters (164 ft), small amounts of stress can result in a large amount of strain, causing the deformation to become a plastic flow rather than elastic. At this point the glacier will begin to deform under its own weight and flow across the landscape. According to the Glen–Nye flow law, the relationship between stress and strain, and thus the rate of internal flow, can be modeled as follows:

where: 
 = shear strain (flow) rate
 = stress
 = a constant between 2–4 (typically 3 for most glaciers) that increases with lower temperature
 = a temperature-dependent constant

The lowest velocities are near the base of the glacier and along valley sides where friction acts against flow, causing the most deformation. Velocity increases inward toward the center line and upward, as the amount of deformation decreases. The highest flow velocities are found at the surface, representing the sum of the velocities of all the layers below.

Glaciers may also move by basal sliding, where the base of the glacier is lubricated by meltwater, allowing the glacier to slide over the terrain on which it sits. Meltwater may be produced by pressure-induced melting, friction or geothermal heat.  The more variable the amount of melting at surface of the glacier, the faster the ice will flow.

The top 50 meters of the glacier form the fracture zone, where ice moves as a single unit.  Cracks form as the glacier moves over irregular terrain, which may penetrate the full depth of the fracture zone.

Subglacial processes

Most of the important processes controlling glacial motion occur in the ice-bed contact—even though it is only a few meters thick. Glaciers will move by sliding when the basal shear stress drops below the shear resulting from the glacier's weight.

τD = ρgh sin α
where τD is the driving stress, and α the ice surface slope in radians.

τB is the basal shear stress, a function of bed temperature and softness.

τF, the shear stress, is the lower of τB and τD.  It controls the rate of plastic flow, as per the figure (inset, right).

For a given glacier, the two variables are τD, which varies with h, the depth of the glacier, and τB, the basal shear stress.

Basal shear stress
The basal shear stress is a function of three factors: the bed's temperature, roughness and softness.

Whether a bed is hard or soft depends on the porosity and pore pressure; higher porosity decreases the sediment strength (thus increases the shear stress τB). If the sediment strength falls far below τD, movement of the glacier will be accommodated by motion in the sediments, as opposed to sliding.
Porosity may vary through a range of methods.  
Movement of the overlying glacier may cause the bed to undergo dilatancy; the resulting shape change reorganises blocks. This increases the porosity. Unless water is added, this will necessarily reduce the pore pressure (as the pore fluids have more space to occupy).
Pressure may cause compaction and consolidation of underlying sediments. Since water is relatively incompressible, this is easier when the pore space is filled with vapour; any water must be removed to permit compression.  In soils, this is an irreversible process.
Sediment degradation by abrasion and fracture decreases the size of particles, which tends to decrease pore space, although the motion of the particles may disorder the sediment, with the opposite effect. These processes also generate heat, whose importance will be discussed later.

A soft bed, with high porosity and low pore fluid pressure, allows the glacier to move by sediment sliding: the base of the glacier may even remain frozen to the bed, where the underlying sediment slips underneath it like a tube of toothpaste.  A hard bed cannot deform in this way; therefore the only way for hard-based glaciers to move is by basal sliding, where meltwater forms between the ice and the bed itself.

Bed softness may vary in space or time, and changes dramatically from glacier to glacier.  An important factor is the underlying 
geology; glacial speeds tend to differ more when they change bedrock than when the gradient changes.

As well as affecting the sediment stress, fluid pressure (pw) can affect the friction between the glacier and the bed.  High fluid pressure provides a buoyancy force upwards on the glacier, reducing the friction at its base.  The fluid pressure is compared to the ice overburden pressure, pi, given by ρgh.  Under fast-flowing ice streams, these two pressures will be approximately equal, with an effective pressure (pi – pw) of 30 kPa; i.e. all of the weight of the ice is supported by the underlying water, and the glacier is afloat.

Basal melt
A number of factors can affect bed temperature, which is intimately associated with basal meltwater.  
The melting point of water decreases under pressure, meaning that water melts at a lower temperature under thicker glaciers. This acts as a "double whammy", because thicker glaciers have a lower heat conductance, meaning that the basal temperature is also likely to be higher.

Bed temperature tends to vary in a cyclic fashion.  A cool bed has a high strength, reducing the speed of the glacier.  This increases the rate of accumulation, since newly fallen snow is not transported away.  Consequently, the glacier thickens, with three consequences: firstly, the bed is better insulated, allowing greater retention of geothermal heat.  Secondly, the increased pressure can facilitate melting.  Most importantly, τD is increased.  These factors will combine to accelerate the glacier.  As friction increases with the square of velocity, faster motion will greatly increase frictional heating, with ensuing melting – which causes a positive feedback, increasing ice speed to a faster flow rate still: west Antarctic glaciers are known to reach velocities of up to a kilometre per year.
Eventually, the ice will be surging fast enough that it begins to thin, as accumulation cannot keep up with the transport.  This thinning will increase the conductive heat loss, slowing the glacier and causing freezing.  This freezing will slow the glacier further, often until it is stationary, whence the cycle can begin again.

Supraglacial lakes represent another possible supply of liquid water to the base of glaciers, so they can play an important role in accelerating glacial motion.
Lakes of a diameter greater than ~300 m are capable of creating a fluid-filled crevasse to the glacier/bed interface.
When these crevasses form, the entirety of the lake's (relatively warm) contents can reach the base of the glacier in as little as 2–18 hours – lubricating the bed and causing the glacier to surge. Water that reaches the bed of a glacier may freeze there, increasing the thickness of the glacier by pushing it up from below.

Finally, bed roughness can act to slow glacial motion. The roughness of the bed is a measure of how many boulders and obstacles protrude into the overlying ice.  Ice flows around these obstacles by melting under the high pressure on their stoss side; the resultant meltwater is then forced into the cavity arising in their lee side, where it re-freezes.

Pipe and sheet flow
The flow of water under the glacial surface can have a large effect on the motion of the glacier itself.  Subglacial lakes contain significant amounts of water, which can move fast: cubic kilometres can be transported between lakes over the course of a couple of years.

This motion is thought to occur in two main modes: pipe flow involves liquid water moving through pipe-like conduits, like a sub-glacial river; sheet flow involves motion of water in a thin layer.  A switch between the two flow conditions may be associated with surging behaviour. Indeed, the loss of sub-glacial water supply has been linked with the shut-down of ice movement in the Kamb ice stream. The subglacial motion of water is expressed in the surface topography of ice sheets, which slump down into vacated subglacial lakes.

Effects

Climate change

The implications of the current climate change on ice sheets are difficult to ascertain. It is clear that increasing temperatures are resulting in reduced ice volumes globally. (Due to increased precipitation, the mass of parts of the Antarctic ice sheet may currently be increasing, but the total mass balance is unclear.)

Rising sea levels will reduce the stability of ice shelves, which have a key role in reducing glacial motion.  Some Antarctic ice shelves are currently thinning by tens of metres per year, and the collapse of the Larsen B shelf was preceded by thinning of just 1 metre per year. Further, increased ocean temperatures of 1 °C may lead to up to 10 metres per year of basal melting. Ice shelves are always stable under mean annual temperatures of −9 °C, but never stable above −5 °C; this places regional warming of 1.5 °C, as preceded the collapse of Larsen B, in context.

Increasing global air temperatures take around 10,000 years to directly propagate through the ice before they influence bed temperatures, but may have an effect through increased surfacal melting, producing more supraglacial lakes, which may feed warm water to glacial bases and facilitate glacial motion. In areas of increased precipitation, such as Antarctica, the addition of mass will increase rate of glacial motion, hence the turnover in the ice sheet. Observations, while currently limited in scope, do agree with these predictions of an increasing rate of ice loss from both Greenland and Antarctica. A possible positive feedback may result from shrinking ice caps, in volcanically active Iceland at least.  Isostatic rebound may lead to increased volcanic activity, causing basal warming – and, through  release, further climate change.

Cold meltwater provides cooling of the ocean's surface layer, acting like a lid, and also affecting deeper waters by increasing subsurface ocean warming and thus facilitating ice melt.

Erosion
Because ice can flow faster where it is thicker, the rate of glacier-induced erosion is directly proportional to the thickness of overlying ice.  Consequently, pre-glacial low hollows will be deepened and pre-existing topography will be amplified by glacial action, while nunataks, which protrude above ice sheets, barely erode at all – erosion has been estimated as 5 m per 1.2 million years. This explains, for example, the deep profile of fjords, which can reach a kilometer in depth as ice is topographically steered into them.  The extension of fjords inland increases the rate of ice sheet thinning since they are the principal conduits for draining ice sheets. It also makes the ice sheets more sensitive to changes in climate and the ocean.

See also 
 Ice-sheet model

References

Further reading

Glaciology
Ice sheets
Articles containing video clips